Massey's Folly was built by Thomas Hacket Massey who served as rector in Farringdon village in Hampshire for 62 years. The folly took thirty years to build. The reason the construction was so protracted was that the folly was entirely built by Massey along with a single bricklayer. Further delays were due to Massey occasionally demolishing completed parts of the structure and making further additions. It has seventeen bedrooms and two towers.  Its purpose is unknown but since 1925 it has been used as a school and village hall. Massey is buried just outside the church porch.

The folly featured on the BBC's Restoration Village programme. It is now in receipt of National Lottery Heritage Funding.

References

 David Hancock AA 50 walks in Hampshire and Isle of Wight 2001;

External links
Farringdon village Massey's Folly
BBC Restoration Village programme

Folly buildings in England
Buildings and structures in Hampshire